Stodůlky, is a cadastral area (katastrální území) in Prague, Czech Republic. Originally a village (first written mention of which dates from 1159), later municipality (since 1849), it remained a predominantly agricultural settlement until the 1960s. Stodůlky became part of Prague in 1974 and the large housing estate of Jihozápadní Město gradually arose on fields in vicinity of the old village in the late 1970s through mid-1990s. Západní Město, a western extension of the built-up area is currently (as of 2011) under construction.

The name derives from the Czech noun stodola for barn; Stodůlky is then a pluralized diminutive of that word (i.e. meaning "small barns").

It borders cadastral areas of Řepy in the north, Motol in the northeast, Jinonice in the east, Holyně and Řeporyje in the south, Třebonice in the west and Zličín in the northwest. As a whole it belongs to Praha 5 territorial district. For administrative purposes the vast majority of Stodůlky is designated as an administrative district of Praha 13, while a small section of it falls under Praha-Řeporyje.

Stodůlky is served by Line B of the Prague Metro with five stations being located on its territory (each station in general bears the name of the corresponding housing subdistrict). The stations are (in direction from city centre):
 Nové Butovice
 Hůrka
 Lužiny
 Luka
 Stodůlky

Gallery

External links 

 Praha 13 - Official homepage

Districts of Prague